Maierhöfen is a municipality in the district of Lindau in Bavaria in Germany.

Geography
Maierhöfen is located in the Westallgäu, Allgäu region.

History
Before becoming a part of Bavaria, Maierhöfen belonged to Austria as a part of the Bregenz-Hohenegg authority. Since the signing of the peace treaties of Brünn and Preßburg in 1805 the town belongs to Bavaria. In the course of the administrative reforms in Bavaria the contemporary municipality was formed by the "Gemeindeedikt" of 1818.

Population development
In 1970 1,133, in 1987 1,306 and in 2000 1,503 inhabitants were living in the municipality of Gestratz.

Politics
The mayor of the town is Martin Schwarz (Wählergemeinschaft).

The revenue from the municipal tax added up to 434,000 € in 1999, of which the net business tax amounted to 28,000 €.

Culture and notable sights
 Eistobel
 Hengelesweiher
 Ski lifts at the Flucken and Iberg

Economy and infrastructure

Economy, agriculture and forestry
According to the official statistics, in 1998 there were 62 employees who were subject to social insurance contribution in the industrial sector and none the sector of trade and transport at place of work. In miscellaneous sectors there were 242 people employed at place of work. At place of domicile there were 375 employees altogether. In the industrial sector there were none, in the main construction trade six businesses. Moreover, there were 60 agricultural businesses in 1999 with a total area of 1,150 ha.

Education
In 1999 there were the following institutions:
Kindergartens: 50 kindergarten places with 52 children

Notable people

Notable people living in Maierhöfen
 René Giessen (born 1944), German musician

References

Lindau (district)